Otter Pond is located southeast of Star Lake, New York. Fish species present in the lake are white sucker, brown bullhead, and yellow perch. Access via Bushwhack Trail from Old Hay Road along Otter Creek. No motors are allowed on Otter Pond.

References

Lakes of St. Lawrence County, New York